Annette Peulvast-Bergeal (born August 21, 1946 in Mantes-la-Ville, Yvelines) is a former member of the National Assembly of France, a former member of the Socialist Party, and is now affiliated with the Miscellaneous left. In April 2000, Jean-Marie Le Pen of the Front National was found guilty of physical assault against Peulvast-Bergeal, which led to his temporary suspension from the European Parliament.

References

1946 births
Living people
People from Yvelines
Politicians from Île-de-France
Socialist Party (France) politicians
Deputies of the 11th National Assembly of the French Fifth Republic
Women members of the National Assembly (France)
21st-century French women politicians
20th-century French women